Dmitry Pavlovich Grigorovich (born in Kyiv, Russian Empire, now Ukraine, 25 January (6 February) 1883, died 26 July 1938 in Moscow) was a Ukrainian, Russian, and Soviet aircraft designer of a number of planes under the Grigorovich name.

References

This article about a Ukrainian, Russian and Soviet aircraft designer is a stub. You can help Wikipedia by expanding it.

1883 births
1938 deaths
Engineers from Kyiv
Igor Sikorsky Kyiv Polytechnic Institute
Aircraft designers
Soviet aerospace engineers
20th-century Ukrainian inventors
Russian aerospace engineers
Academic staff of Moscow Aviation Institute
Burials at Novodevichy Cemetery
20th-century Ukrainian engineers